Thirlwall is a surname. Notable people with the surname include:

Anthony Thirlwall (born 1941), Professor of Applied Economics at the University of Kent 
Thirlwall's Law, a law of economics
Connop Thirlwall (1797–1875), English clergyman and historian, Bishop of Saint David's
Thirlwall Prize, awarded at Cambridge University
Jade Thirlwall, Member of British four-piece girl group Little Mix

See also
Thirlwall Castle, Northumberland, England
Thelwall
Thelwell